Johann Goldsmid, better known by his Latinized name Johann(es) Fabricius (8 January 1587 – 19 March 1616), eldest son of David Fabricius (1564–1617), was a Frisian/German astronomer and a discoverer of sunspots (in 1610), independently of Galileo Galilei.

Biography
Johannes was born in Resterhafe (East Friesland).  He studied at the University of Helmstedt, Wittenberg University and graduated from Leiden University in 1611. He returned from university in the Netherlands with telescopes that he and his father turned on the Sun. Despite the difficulties of observing the sun directly, they noted the existence of sunspots, the first confirmed instance of their observation (though unclear statements in East Asian annals suggest that Chinese and Korean astronomers may have discovered them with the naked eye previously, and Fabricius may have noticed them himself without a telescope a few years before). Johannes first observed a sunspot on February 27, 1611; in Wittenberg in that year he published the results of his observations in his 22-page pamphlet De Maculis in Sole observatis..... It was the first publication on the topic of sunspots.

The pair soon used camera obscura telescopy so as to save their eyes and get a better view of the solar disk, and observed that the spots moved. They would appear on the eastern edge of the disk, steadily move to the western edge, disappear, then reappear at the east again after the same amount of time that it had taken for it to cross the disk in the first place.

He is also mentioned in Jules Verne's From the Earth to the Moon as someone who claimed to have seen lunar inhabitants through his telescope, though that particular fact is merely part of Verne's fiction. The large Fabricius crater, on the Moon's southern hemisphere, is named after his father, David Fabricius.

He died in Marienhafe, at the age of 29.

Legacy
In 1895, a monument was erected to his memory in the churchyard at Osteel, where his father had been pastor from 1603 until 1616.

Work

Joh. Fabricii Phrysii De Maculis in Sole observatis, et apparente earum cum Sole conversione, Narratio, etc. Witebergae, Anno M.DC.XI. (year 1611).

Notes

References
Gerhard Berthold: Der Magister Johann Fabricius und die Sonnenflecken, nebst einem Excurs über David Fabricius (Magister Johann Fabricius and Sunspots, together with a Digression on David Fabricius), Leipzig, 1894.
L. Häpke: "Fabricius und die Entdeckung der Sonnenflecken" ("Fabricius and the Discovery of Sunspots") in: Abhandlungen des naturwissenschaftlichen Vereins zu Bremen, 10, 1888, pp. 249–272.
Bernhard Bunte: "Über Johannes Fabricus, den Entdecker der Sonnenflecken" ("On Johannes Fabricius, the Discoverer of Sunspots") in: Jahrbuch der Ges. für bildende Kunst und vaterländ. Altertümer zu Emden, 9, H. 1, 1890, pp. 59–77.
Diedrich Wattenberg: David Fabricius. Der Astronom Ostfrieslands (David Fabricius. Astronomer of East Friesland), Berlin 1964.
Fritz Krafft: in Walther Killy's Literaturlexikon: Autoren und Werke deutscher Sprache (Literature-Lexicon: Authors and Words of German Language), 15 volumes, Gütersloh; München: Bertelsmann-Lexikon-Verl. 1988-1991 (CD-ROM Berlin 1998 ), Vol. 3.
Wilfried Schroeder, The Discovery of Sunspots, Bremen 2009

External links
The Galileo Project — biography of David and Johannes Fabricius.
Entry in the biographical encyclopedia of East Frisia (German)
Celebrating 400 Years of Sunspot Observations.

1587 births
1616 deaths
East Frisians
Frisian scientists
17th-century German astronomers
Leiden University alumni
People from Aurich (district)